Hélio Monteiro Batista (born 28 January 1990), sometimes known as just Hélio, is a Brazilian footballer who plays as a defender for Iraqi Premier League team Zakho.

References

External links
 

1990 births
Living people
People from Teresina
Brazilian footballers
Association football defenders
Liga Portugal 2 players
Campeonato Brasileiro Série B players
Moldovan Super Liga players
Desportivo Brasil players
G.D. Estoril Praia players
Rio Preto Esporte Clube players
Esporte Clube Noroeste players
União Agrícola Barbarense Futebol Clube players
Boa Esporte Clube players
Comercial Futebol Clube (Ribeirão Preto) players
Capivariano Futebol Clube players
Guarani FC players
FC Zimbru Chișinău players
Mirassol Futebol Clube players
Associação Atlética Caldense players
Brazilian expatriate footballers
Brazilian expatriate sportspeople in Portugal
Expatriate footballers in Portugal
Brazilian expatriate sportspeople in Moldova
Expatriate footballers in Moldova
Sportspeople from Piauí